Englewood is a city in Bergen County, in the U.S. state of New Jersey. Englewood was incorporated as a city by an act of the New Jersey Legislature on March 17, 1899, from portions of Ridgefield Township and the remaining portions of Englewood Township. As of the 2020 United States census, the city's population was 29,308, its highest decennial count ever and an increase of 2,161 (+8.0%) from the 2010 census count of 27,147, which in turn reflected an increase of 944 (+3.6%) from the 26,203 counted in the 2000 census.

History

Etymology
Englewood Township, the city's predecessor, is believed to have been named in 1859 for the Engle family. The community had been called the "English Neighborhood", as the first primarily English-speaking settlement on the New Jersey side of the Hudson River after New Netherland was annexed by England in 1664, though other sources mention the Engle family and the heavily forested areas of the community as the derivation of the name. Other sources indicate that the name is derived from "wood ingle", meaning "woody nook", or that the name was coined anew.

Numerous other settlements in the United States were named for Englewood as settlement in North America expanded westward. J. Wyman Jones is credited with convincing residents to choose Englewood for the city's name when it was incorporated over such alternatives as "Brayton" and "Paliscena".

Pre-Colonial and Colonial era
Englewood, like the rest of New Jersey, was populated by Lenape Native Americans prior to European colonization. The Lenape who lived in the Englewood region were of the "turtle clan" which used a stylized turtle as its symbol. 2,000 Lenape originally lived in Englewood, but due to conflicts with the Europeans their population dwindled down to 50 by 1832.

When Henry Hudson sailed up what would become known as the Hudson River in 1607, he claimed the entirety of the watershed of the river, including Englewood, for the Netherlands, making the future region of Englewood a part of New Netherland. However, the region remained largely unsettled under Dutch rule as the Dutch did little to encourage settlement north of modern Hudson County, as the imposing New Jersey Palisades blocked expansion on the west bank of the Hudson.

In 1664, after the Dutch surrendered all of New Netherland to England, the rate of settlement picked up. The English were generous with land grants, and many families, not only English but also Dutch and Huguenot, settled the area, which during the colonial era was known as the English Neighborhood. Street names in Englewood still recall the relative diversity of its earliest settlers; Brinckerhoff, Van Brunt, Lydecker, Van Nostrand and Durie (Duryea), all Dutch; Demarest (de Marais), DeMott and Lozier (Le Sueur), French Huguenot; and Moore, Lawrence, Cole and Day, English.

Historical notes
From 1906 until March 16, 1907, when it burned down, Englewood was the site of Upton Sinclair's socialist-inflected intentional community, the Helicon Home Colony. Associated with the project were Charlotte Perkins Gilman and Sinclair Lewis.

Direct distance dialing, which allowed callers to reach other users outside their local calling area without operator assistance, was introduced to the public in Englewood. On November 10, 1951, Englewood Mayor M. Leslie Denning made the first customer-dialed long-distance call, to Mayor Frank Osborne of Alameda, California. As of that date, customers of the Englewood 3, Englewood 4 and Teaneck 7 exchanges, who could already dial some exchanges in the New York City area, were able to dial 11 cities across the United States by dialing the three-digit area code preceding the local number.

Two years after his graduation from Fordham University, Vince Lombardi began his football coaching career at Englewood's St. Cecilia High School, which closed in 1986.

The Sugarhill Gang recorded "Rapper's Delight" in 1979, the first hip hop single to become a Top 40 hit.

Historic sites
Sites in the city listed on the National Register of Historic Places include:
 John G. Benson House (at 60 Grand Avenue; added January 9, 1983)
 Thomas Demarest House (at 370 Grand Avenue; added January 9, 1983)
 Garret Lydecker House (at 228 Grand Avenue; added January 9, 1983)
 St. Paul's Episcopal Church (at 113 Engle Street; added May 5, 2014)
 Peter Westervelt House and Barn (at 290 Grand Avenue; added March 19, 1975)

Geography
According to the United States Census Bureau, the city had a total area of 4.95 square miles (12.82 km2), including 4.93 square miles (12.76 km2) of land and 0.02 square miles (0.06 km2) of water (0.46%).

Unincorporated communities, localities and place names located partially or completely within the city include Highwood.

The city borders the Bergen County municipalities of Bergenfield, Englewood Cliffs, Fort Lee, Leonia, Teaneck and Tenafly.

Demographics

2010 census

The Census Bureau's 2006–2010 American Community Survey showed that (in 2010 inflation-adjusted dollars) median household income was $69,915 (with a margin of error of +/− $7,291) and the median family income was $87,361 (+/− $9,616). Males had a median income of $58,776 (+/− $7,972) versus $48,571 (+/− $3,984) for females. The per capita income for the borough was $41,533 (+/− $2,981). About 6.9% of families and 10.0% of the population were below the poverty line, including 10.7% of those under age 18 and 15.8% of those age 65 or over.

Same-sex couples headed 73 households in 2010, an increase from the 63 counted in 2000.

2000 census

As of the 2000 United States census, there were 26,203 people, 9,273 households, and 6,481 families residing in the city. The population density was 5,322.0 people per square mile (2,056.3/km2). There were 9,614 housing units at an average density of 1,952.7 per square mile (754.5/km2). The racial makeup of the city was 42.49% White, 38.98% African American, 0.27% Native American, 5.21% Asian, 0.05% Pacific Islander, 8.50% from other races, and 4.50% from two or more races. 21.76% of the population were Hispanic or Latino of any race.

About 7.17% of Englewood residents identified themselves as being of Colombian American ancestry in the 2000 Census, the ninth-highest percentage of the population of any municipality in the United States.

There were 9,273 households, out of which 31.0% had children under the age of 18 living with them, 47.9% were married couples living together, 17.4% had a female householder with no husband present, and 30.1% were non-families. 24.8% of all households were made up of individuals, and 9.0% had someone living alone who was 65 years of age or older. The average household size was 2.79 and the average family size was 3.29.

In the city the population was spread out, with 23.9% under the age of 18, 7.4% from 18 to 24, 30.5% from 25 to 44, 24.9% from 45 to 64, and 13.3% who were 65 years of age or older. The median age was 37 years. For every 100 females, there were 88.7 males. For every 100 females age 18 and over, there were 84.2 males.

The median income for a household in the city was $58,379, and the median income for a family was $67,194. Males had a median income of $41,909 versus $34,358 for females. The per capita income for the city was $35,275. 8.9% of the population and 6.6% of families were below the poverty line. 10.2% of those under the age of 18 and 8.6% of those 65 and older were living below the poverty line.

Sports
Englewood Golf Club is a former golf club that was located between Englewood and Leonia. It hosted the 1909 U.S. Open tournament.

Englewood Field Club is a sports club that features tennis courts, a pool, and an outdoor hockey rink.

Parks and recreation

MacKay Park, located on North Van Brunt Street, includes an ice hockey rink, a pool, a walking path, and athletic fields.

Flat Rock Brook Nature Center, located at 433 Van Nostrand Avenue, is made up of the remnants of the Palisades Forest. The center, established in 1973, is a  preserve and education center that includes  of walking trails and several gardens including the newly renovated Butterfly Garden. Flat Rock allows visitors to learn about the natural ecosystem preserved in the park through exhibits and tours available year-round.

Government

Local government

In 1980, Englewood switched from a Mayor-Council form of government to a modified Council-Manager plan of government in accordance with a Special Charter granted by the New Jersey Legislature. The city is one of 11 municipalities (of the 564) statewide that use a special charter granted by the Legislature. The governing body is comprised of the Mayor and the City Council. Under this charter, the mayor has powers to appoint and veto, while the council functions as a legislative body, with some power to appoint and confirm appointments. The city is divided into four wards which are approximately equal in population. The City Council is comprised of five members, each elected for a three-year term. Four are elected from the individual wards in which they live and the other is elected by a citywide vote as an at-large member. Administrative functions are responsibilities of the City Manager. The six seats in the governing body are elected in a three-year cycle as part of the November general election, with wards two and four both up together, followed a year later by wards one and three, and then the at-large council and mayoral seats. Each ward votes in two of the three years in the cycle, once for its ward seat, in the other year for the two positions voted at-large and one year with no election.

The mayor appoints members to the Planning Board, the Library Board of Trustees, and, with council confirmation, the Board of Adjustment. The mayor serves on the Planning Board. The mayor attends and may speak at council meetings, but only votes to break a tie for passage of an ordinance or resolution. The mayor has veto power over ordinances, but can be overridden with votes from four council members. The City Council is the legislative branch of government, deciding public policy, creating city ordinances and resolutions, passing the city budget, appropriating funds for city services, and hiring the City Manager. The City Council meets generally four times per month (except during summer months).

, the Mayor of Englewood is Democrat Michael Wildes, whose term of office ends December 31, 2024. Members of the City Council are Charles Cobb (D, 2024; At-Large), Judith Maron (D, 2023; Ward 3), Dr. Kenneth Rosensweig (D, 2023; Ward 1), Kevin A. Wilson (D, 2025; Ward 4) and Lisa Wisotsky (D, 2025; Ward 2).

Fire Department

The Englewood Fire Association, a volunteer company established in 1887 as the city's first organized fire protection service, built a firehouse on North Van Brunt Street, near the site of Englewood's current city hall. A professional paid fire department was created in 1912 with the establishment of a Board of Fire Examiners. The fire headquarters constructed on William Street in 1926 was used for 90 years until its replacement by the Jack Drakeford Englewood Firehouse on South Van Brunt Street, which was dedicated on May 14, 2016. The department has a uniformed force of 57 members, including a Chief, Deputy Chief, 4 Captains, 9 Lieutenants and 42 firefighters.

Police department
The city's police department includes 85 employees, of whom 79 are sworn officers and an additional six dispatchers. After a no-confidence vote against the department's leadership in December 2020, the police union suspended a group of eight officers, seven of them Black, who had supported the chief and deputy chief.

Federal, state, and county representation 
Englewood is located in the 5th Congressional District and is part of New Jersey's 37th state legislative district.

In redistricting following the 2010 census, which was in effect from 2013 to 2022, the city was in the 9th congressional district.

Politics
As of March 2011, there were a total of 15,033 registered voters in Englewood, of which 8,571 (57.0% vs. 31.7% countywide) were registered as Democrats, 1,215 (8.1% vs. 21.1%) were registered as Republicans and 5,240 (34.9% vs. 47.1%) were registered as Unaffiliated. There were 7 voters registered as Libertarians or Greens. Among the city's 2010 Census population, 55.4% (vs. 57.1% in Bergen County) were registered to vote, including 71.2% of those ages 18 and over (vs. 73.7% countywide).

In the 2012 presidential election, Democrat Barack Obama received 8,855 votes (76.8% vs. 54.8% countywide), ahead of Republican Mitt Romney with 2,502 votes (21.7% vs. 43.5%) and other candidates with 71 votes (0.6% vs. 0.9%), among the 11,533 ballots cast by the city's 16,586 registered voters, for a turnout of 69.5% (vs. 70.4% in Bergen County). In the 2008 presidential election, Democrat Barack Obama received 9,412 votes (77.0% vs. 53.9% countywide), ahead of Republican John McCain with 2,625 votes (21.5% vs. 44.5%) and other candidates with 58 votes (0.5% vs. 0.8%), among the 12,221 ballots cast by the city's 16,065 registered voters, for a turnout of 76.1% (vs. 76.8% in Bergen County). In the 2004 presidential election, Democrat John Kerry received 8,087 votes (73.6% vs. 51.7% countywide), ahead of Republican George W. Bush with 2,798 votes (25.5% vs. 47.2%) and other candidates with 65 votes (0.6% vs. 0.7%), among the 10,990 ballots cast by the city's 14,702 registered voters, for a turnout of 74.8% (vs. 76.9% in the whole county).

In the 2013 gubernatorial election, Democrat Barbara Buono received 62.5% of the vote (3,367 cast), ahead of Republican Chris Christie with 36.6% (1,972 votes), and other candidates with 0.9% (49 votes), among the 5,557 ballots cast by the city's 15,615 registered voters (169 ballots were spoiled), for a turnout of 35.6%. In the 2009 gubernatorial election, Democrat Jon Corzine received 5,304 ballots cast (73.8% vs. 48.0% countywide), ahead of Republican Chris Christie with 1,613 votes (22.5% vs. 45.8%), Independent Chris Daggett with 170 votes (2.4% vs. 4.7%) and other candidates with 20 votes (0.3% vs. 0.5%), among the 7,184 ballots cast by the city's 15,534 registered voters, yielding a 46.2% turnout (vs. 50.0% in the county).

Education

Public schools
The Englewood Public School District serves students in pre-kindergarten through twelfth grade. It operates Dwight Morrow High School. Students from Englewood Cliffs attend Dwight Morrow High School, as part of a sending/receiving relationship with the Englewood Cliffs Public Schools.

As of the 2018–19 school year, the district, comprised of five schools, had an enrollment of 3,078 students and 247.0 classroom teachers (on an FTE basis), for a student–teacher ratio of 12.5:1. Schools in the district (with 2018–19 enrollment data from the National Center for Education Statistics) are 
D. A. Quarles Early Childhood Center with 417 students in grades Pre-K–K, 
Dr. John Grieco Elementary School with 394 students in grades 1–2, 
McCloud School with 580 students in grades 3–5, 
Janis E. Dismus Middle School with 563 students in grades 6–8 and 
Dwight Morrow High School / Academies @ Englewood with 1,063 students in grades 9–12. In 2009, Cleveland School was renamed in memory of the district's first African-American principal, Dr. Leroy McCloud, who had a 50-year career in the district.

Public school students from the city, and all of Bergen County, are eligible to attend the secondary education programs offered by the Bergen County Technical Schools, which include the Bergen County Academies in Hackensack, and the Bergen Tech campus in Teterboro or Paramus. The district offers programs on a shared-time or full-time basis, with admission based on a selective application process and tuition covered by the student's home school district.

As an alternative to regular public education, the city is home of the Englewood on the Palisades Charter School, which had an enrollment of 317 students in Kindergarten through fifth grade, as of the 2018–2019 school year. Shalom Academy, a charter school with a focus on Hebrew language immersion, had planned to open for grades K–5 in September 2011, serving students from both Englewood and Teaneck, but failed to receive final approval from the New Jersey Department of Education.

Private schools
Englewood is the home to a number of private schools. Dwight-Englewood School, serves 900 students in pre-kindergarten through twelfth grade, housed in three separate divisions. Founded in 1930, Elisabeth Morrow School serves students in preschool through eighth grade. Moriah School of Englewood, one of the county's largest, is a Jewish day school with an enrollment that had been as high as 1,000 students in preschool through eighth grade. Yeshiva Ohr Simcha serves students in high school for grades 9–12 and offers a postgraduate yeshiva program.

In the face of a declining enrollment, St. Cecilia Interparochial School was closed by the Roman Catholic Archdiocese of Newark at the end of the 2010–2011 school year, with an expected student body of 85 students for K–8 in the following year constituting less than half of the number of students needed to keep the school financially viable. St. Cecilia High School, where Vince Lombardi coached football 1939–1947, had been closed in 1986.

Healthcare 
Englewood Hospital and Medical Center, located on Engle Street, is known for its cardiac, bloodless surgery, and breast care programs.

Transportation

Roads and highways

Interstate 95 is the most prominent highway serving Englewood. It travels through Englewood for  near the city's southern border with Leonia. Originally built by the New Jersey Department of Transportation, this section is now owned and operated as part of the New Jersey Turnpike, though it is not tolled.

The city is also served by Route 4, Route 93, County Route 501, and County Route 505. The northern terminus of Route 93 is at the intersection with Route 4, but the road continues north as CR 501.

Public transportation
Several NJ Transit bus lines serve Englewood. The 166 provides local and express service to and from the Port Authority Bus Terminal in Midtown Manhattan; the 171, 175, 178 and 186 provide service to / from the George Washington Bridge Bus Station in uptown Manhattan; and the 756 and 780 offer local service. Rockland Coaches provides scheduled service to / from the Port Authority Bus Terminal on Routes 21T, 14ET, 11T, 11AT, 20, and 20T. Saddle River Tours / Ameribus provides rush hour service on weekdays to / from the George Washington Bridge Bus Station on the 11C and 20/84 routes.

Erie Railroad's suburban Northern Branch (NRRNJ) started passenger service in Englewood in 1859, at various stations including the still extant building at Depot Square. It  originated/terminated at Pavonia Terminal on the Hudson River in Jersey City and was ended in September 1966 (by which time trains had been redirected to Hoboken Terminal).

The Northern Branch Corridor Project is a proposed NJ Transit (NJT) project to extend the Hudson–Bergen Light Rail along the line providing service to newly built stations along the route. The line would stop at Englewood Route 4 and Englewood Town Center and terminate at Englewood Hospital and Medical Center. A station stop at Depot Square is the city's much-preferred alternative to NJT's proposed new Englewood Town Center Station to the south. Englewood Mayor Frank Huttle III worked with Jersey City Mayor Steven Fulop to advocate on behalf of the project and obtain the needed state and federal funding needed to proceed with the plan, with Huttle emphasizing the economic benefits from the project and that the city wanted to host the terminus, which would include a parking garage near Englewood Hospital and additional parking near Palisade Avenue in the commercial center of the city.

Religion
Congregation Ahavath Torah is a Modern Orthodox synagogue in the city that was founded in 1895 and acquired its current site in 1958.

St. Paul's Episcopal Church is an Episcopal church in the city.

St. Cecilia’s Roman Catholic Church.

Notable people

See also
Palisades Mountain House

References

Further reading

 Municipal Incorporations of the State of New Jersey (according to Counties) prepared by the Division of Local Government, Department of the Treasury (New Jersey); December 1, 1958.
 Clayton, W. Woodford; with Nelson, William. History of Bergen and Passaic Counties, New Jersey, with Biographical Sketches of Many of its Pioneers and Prominent Men. Philadelphia: Everts and Peck, 1882.
 Harvey, Cornelius Burnham (ed.), Genealogical History of Hudson and Bergen Counties, New Jersey. New York: New Jersey Genealogical Publishing Co., 1900.
 Van Valen, James M. History of Bergen County, New Jersey. New York: New Jersey Publishing and Engraving Co., 1900.
 Westervelt, Frances A. (Frances Augusta), 1858–1942, History of Bergen County, New Jersey, 1630–1923, Lewis Historical Publishing Company, 1923.

External links

 Englewood official website
 The Englewood Report

 
1899 establishments in New Jersey
Cities in Bergen County, New Jersey
Populated places established in 1899
Special Charters in New Jersey